Hyderabad Hunters may refer to:
 Hyderabad Hunters (badminton team), based in Hyderabad, India.
 Hyderabad Hunters (cricket team), based in Hyderabad, Pakistan in the Pakistan Junior League.